Božidar Milenković (6 March 1954 – 25 July 2020) was a Serbian professional footballer and coach.

Career
Milenković began his career with his hometown club FK Vlasina. In 1973, he signed with FK Dubočica, and played with the club until 1975. In the summer of 1975 he played in the Yugoslav First League with OFK Beograd where he captained the team for eight years. In the summer of 1986, he played abroad in Canada's National Soccer League with Toronto Italia. He assisted Toronto in securing the NSL Championship by defeating Toronto Blizzard. In 1987, he returned to conclude his career with OFK Beograd. In 1987, he played with the Hamilton Steelers.

In 1996, he served as the head coach for OFK Beograd in the First League of FR Yugoslavia. He later served as a club official for OFK Beograd in the capacities of the director of the stadium, and general secretary.

Personal life
On 25 July 2020, he died from coronavirus.

References  

1954 births
2020 deaths
Yugoslav footballers
Association football defenders
FK Vlasina players
FK Dubočica players
OFK Beograd players
Toronto Italia players
Yugoslav First League players
Canadian National Soccer League players
Serbian football managers
OFK Beograd managers
People from Vlasotince
Yugoslav expatriate footballers
Expatriate soccer players in Canada
Yugoslav expatriate sportspeople in Canada
Deaths from the COVID-19 pandemic in Serbia
Hamilton Steelers (1981–1992) players